Taman Sari may refer to:

 Taman Sari (Jakarta), a district in Jakarta, Indonesia
 Taman Sari (Yogyakarta), a location in Yogyakarta, Indonesia
 Tamansari, an area in Bandung, Indonesia
 Tamansari (Bogor Regency), a district in Bogor Regency, West Java, Indonesia